Zózimo Alves Calazaes, best known as Zózimo (19 June 1932 – 21 July 1977) was a Brazilian footballer whose career as a defender and midfielder lasted from 1948 to 1967.

Born in Plataforma, a bairro of Salvador, the capital of Bahia, Zózimo played for Brazil's São Cristóvão, Bangu, Flamengo, Portuguesa and Esportiva de Guarantinguetá, as well as Peru's Sport Boys in Callao and El Salvador's Club Deportivo Águila in San Miguel. He won one Rio de Janeiro State Championship in 1965 and was a two-time winner for the Brazilian team at the FIFA World Cup in 1958 and 1962. He was also part of Brazil's squad for the 1952 Summer Olympics. In his 19-year career he earned a reputation as one of Brazil's most highly skilled players.

Four weeks after his 45th birthday, Zózimo died in a road accident in Rio de Janeiro.

References

External links

1932 births
1977 deaths
Sportspeople from Bahia
Brazilian footballers
Brazilian football managers
Association football defenders
Association football midfielders
Association football utility players
Brazil international footballers
Footballers at the 1952 Summer Olympics
Olympic footballers of Brazil
1958 FIFA World Cup players
1962 FIFA World Cup players
FIFA World Cup-winning players
Expatriate footballers in El Salvador
Expatriate football managers in El Salvador
Expatriate footballers in Peru
Expatriate football managers in Peru
Road incident deaths in Brazil
Bangu Atlético Clube players
CR Flamengo footballers
Associação Portuguesa de Desportos players
Sporting Cristal footballers
C.D. Águila footballers
C.D. Águila managers
Sport Boys managers
Deportivo Municipal managers
Bangu Atlético Clube managers
Brazilian expatriate sportspeople in El Salvador
Brazilian expatriate sportspeople in Peru